The Seve Trophy was a biennial golf tournament between teams of professional male golfers; one team representing Great Britain and Ireland, the other team representing Continental Europe. The tournament was played in years when there is no Ryder Cup. The competition was held eight times from 2000 to 2013.

The Trophy was named after five times major winner Seve Ballesteros, the most successful golfer ever from Continental Europe who was one of the key instigators of the tournament. He made an exceptional contribution to the European Ryder Cup successes of the 1980s and 1990s, and came to be regarded as an exceptionally keen team man in a usually individualistic sport.

A sponsorship deal with the French media conglomerate Vivendi meant that the 2009 was known as The Vivendi Trophy with Seve Ballesteros, the 2011 event was the Vivendi Seve Trophy and the 2013 event was known as the Seve Trophy by Golf+.

Schedule

The event was played in years when there is no Ryder Cup. Initially this meant even numbered years, but because the 2001 Ryder Cup was postponed by a year due to the terrorist attacks on 11 September 2001, the Seve Trophy was then played in odd numbered years. In 2002 both events were played.

In 2000 and 2002 the event was played in April but from 2003 it was played in the autumn. In 2005, 2007 and 2013 it was held in the same week as Europe's Ryder Cup opponents, Team USA, took on the "International Team" in the Presidents Cup, while in 2009 and 2011 it was scheduled during the PGA Tour's FedEx Cup playoffs.

The Seve Trophy was an "approved special event" on the European Tour. A week in the tour schedule was set aside for it, but the prize money did not count towards the Race to Dubai (previously the Order of Merit).

The 2013 event was the last.

Format

The Seve Trophy was a team event for professional male golfers; one team representing Great Britain and Ireland, the other team representing Continental Europe.

In 2000 and 2002 the trophy was contested over three days (Friday to Sunday) with 8 foursomes/fourball/greensomes matches on each of the first two days (4 in the morning, 4 in the afternoon) and 10 singles matches on the last day. The format was therefore similar to that of the Ryder Cup except that there were less singles matches, since each team consisted of ten players, whereas in the Ryder Cup there are twelve players on each team. An unusual feature was the inclusion of one set of greensome matches.

In 2003 the trophy was extended to four days (Thursday to Sunday). On the first two days there were 5 fourball matches each day. The third day had 4 greensomes in the morning and 4 foursomes in the afternoon, with 10 singles matches on the fourth day. This format remained the same until 2013 when the greensome matches on the third morning were replaced with foursomes matches.

The winner of each match scores a point for his team, with ½ a point each for any match that is tied after the 18 holes. In 2000 and 2002 there were 26 points available and so 13½ points were required for victory. Since 2003 there have been 28 points available and so 14½ are now required for victory.

A foursomes match is a competition between two teams of two golfers. The golfers on the same team take alternate shots throughout the match, with the same ball. Each hole is won by the team that completes the hole in the fewest shots. A greensomes match is similar to a foursomes match except that both players tee off on every hole. Each pair then chooses one of their balls and alternate strokes are then played with that ball to complete the hole. A fourball match is also a competition between two teams of two golfers, but all four golfers play their own ball throughout the round rather than alternating shots, and each hole is won by the team whose individual golfer has the lowest score. A singles match is a standard match play competition between two golfers.

Team qualification and selection
Two captains were chosen by the European Tour. From 2000 to 2005 the captain was automatically one of the members of his team. From 2007 they were non-playing captains.

Eligibility for the Seve Trophy was similar that of the Europe team in the Ryder Cup. Players had to be Europeans and be a member of the European Tour.

From 2000 to 2005 the captain had one "captain's pick", a player chosen at the discretion of the team captains, while in 2007 this was increased to two. However from 2009 team qualification was based solely on qualification criteria:

The leading five eligible players in the Official World Golf Rankings
The leading five eligible players on the European Tour Race to Dubai, not already selected on the first criterion

Results

Of the 8 matches, the Great Britain and Ireland team won 6 while the Continental Europe team won 2.

Appearances
The following are those who played in at least one of the matches.

Great Britain and Ireland
Paul Casey and Colin Montgomerie made the most appearances on the Great Britain and Ireland side, playing in five events each.

  Phillip Archer 2007
  John Bickerton 2000
  Paul Casey 2002, 2003, 2005, 2007, 2013
  Darren Clarke 2000, 2002, 2011
  Brian Davis 2003
  Stephen Dodd 2005
  Jamie Donaldson 2011, 2013
  Nick Dougherty 2005, 2007, 2009
  Bradley Dredge 2005, 2007
  Simon Dyson 2007, 2009, 2011
  Ross Fisher 2009, 2011
  Tommy Fleetwood 2013
  Mark Foster 2011
  Stephen Gallacher 2013
  Pádraig Harrington 2000, 2002, 2003, 2005
  David Horsey 2011
  David Howell 2000, 2003, 2005
  Scott Jamieson 2011, 2013
  Simon Khan 2013
  Paul Lawrie 2000, 2002, 2003, 2013
  David Lynn 2013
  Graeme McDowell 2005, 2009
  Paul McGinley 2002, 2005
  Rory McIlroy 2009
  Colin Montgomerie 2000, 2002, 2003, 2005, 2007
  Andrew Oldcorn 2002
  Gary Orr 2000
  Ian Poulter 2003, 2005, 2011
  Phillip Price 2000, 2003
  Robert Rock 2009, 2011
  Justin Rose 2003, 2007
  Graeme Storm 2007
  Anthony Wall 2009
  Marc Warren 2007, 2013
  Steve Webster 2002, 2009
  Lee Westwood 2000, 2002, 2003, 2011
  Oliver Wilson 2007, 2009
  Chris Wood 2009, 2013
  Ian Woosnam 2000, 2002

Continental Europe
Miguel Ángel Jiménez was the only golfer to play in all eight Seve Trophy events on the Continental side.

  Seve Ballesteros 2000, 2002, 2003
  Thomas Bjørn 2000, 2002, 2003, 2005, 2007, 2011, 2013
  Grégory Bourdy 2013
  Markus Brier 2007
  Emanuele Canonica 2005
  Alex Čejka 2000, 2002, 2003
  Nicolas Colsaerts 2011, 2013
  Niclas Fasth 2002, 2003, 2005
  Gonzalo Fernández-Castaño 2007, 2009, 2013
  Sergio García 2000, 2003
  Ignacio Garrido 2003
  Mathias Grönberg 2002
  Anders Hansen 2009, 2011
  Søren Hansen 2007, 2009
  Peter Hanson 2005, 2007, 2009, 2011
  Grégory Havret 2007
  Mikko Ilonen 2007, 2013
  Freddie Jacobson 2003
  Raphaël Jacquelin 2002, 2003, 2007, 2011
  Miguel Ángel Jiménez 2000, 2002, 2003, 2005, 2007, 2009, 2011, 2013
  Robert Karlsson 2000, 2002, 2007, 2009
  Søren Kjeldsen 2009
  Maarten Lafeber 2005
  Bernhard Langer 2000
  Pablo Larrazábal 2011
  Thomas Levet 2002, 2005
  Joost Luiten 2013
  Matteo Manassero 2011, 2013
  Francesco Molinari 2009, 2011, 2013
  Alex Norén 2011
  José María Olazábal 2000, 2002, 2003, 2005
  Thorbjørn Olesen 2013
  Álvaro Quirós 2009
  Jean-François Remésy 2005
  Jarmo Sandelin 2000
  Henrik Stenson 2005, 2009
  Jean van de Velde 2000

See also
Hero Cup

References

External links
Coverage on European Tour's official site

Seve Trophy
Team golf tournaments
Recurring sporting events established in 2000
Recurring sporting events disestablished in 2013